Georgy Petrovich Kondratyev (born 7 January 1960) is a Belarusian football coach and former Belarusian and Soviet footballer. From 2011 to 2014 he was in charge of Belarus national team. In 2018, he managed Belshina Bobruisk.

Honours
Dinamo Minsk
 Soviet Top League champion: 1982

Chornomorets Odessa
 USSR Federation Cup winner: 1990

International career
Kondratyev made his debut for the Soviet Union on 10 October 1984 in a 1986 FIFA World Cup qualifier against Norway. He scored 4 goals for the national team, including two in another World Cup qualifier, against Switzerland on 2 May 1985. He was however not selected for the World Cup squad.

References

External links
 Profile 
 
 Georgi Kondratiev at Footballdatabase

1960 births
Living people
People from Talachyn District
Soviet footballers
Soviet Union international footballers
Belarusian footballers
Soviet expatriate footballers
Belarusian expatriate footballers
Expatriate footballers in Austria
Expatriate footballers in Ukraine
Belarusian expatriate sportspeople in Austria
Belarusian expatriate sportspeople in Germany
Belarusian expatriate sportspeople in Ukraine
Belarusian expatriate sportspeople in Finland
Expatriate footballers in Germany
Expatriate footballers in Finland
Soviet Top League players
Ukrainian Premier League players
FC Vitebsk players
FC Dinamo Minsk players
FC Dynamo Brest players
FC Chornomorets Odesa players
FC Lokomotiv Moscow players
SKN St. Pölten players
FC Molodechno players
FC Temp Shepetivka players
FC Slavia Mozyr players
Belarusian football managers
FC Dinamo Minsk managers
FC Vitebsk managers
FC Smorgon managers
Belarus national football team managers
FC Minsk managers
FC Belshina Bobruisk managers
Association football forwards
Sportspeople from Vitebsk Region